Tio Hian Goan (1911 – unknown) was a footballer who represented the Dutch East Indies at the 1934 Far Eastern Championship Games. He was also in the China national football team in 1936, playing one game in a friendly tournament against Portugal. He was called up for the 1936 Summer Olympics, but did not feature.

Career statistics

International

International goals
Scores and results list the Dutch East Indies's goal tally first, score column indicates score after each Dutch East Indies goal.

References

1911 births
Date of death unknown
Sportspeople from Surabaya
Indonesian footballers
Indonesia international footballers
Indonesian people of Chinese descent
Indonesian sportspeople of Chinese descent
Chinese footballers
China international footballers
Association football forwards
Tiong Hoa Soerabaja players
South China AA players